Edmond Guiraud (22 March 1879 – 18 April 1961) was a 20th-century French playwright, librettist, and actor from the Cévennes region in southern France.

Biographie 
Edmond Guiraud lived many years in Roquedur in the Gard department. He had a career as a playwright before World War I.

He became a film actor after World War II, and acted in two films by Jean Gehret, shot in the Cévennes.

His widow, Jeannine Guiraud, donated the musée Cévenol in le Vigan the archives of her husband in order to create an "Edmond Guiraud fund".

Libretto 
1912–1914: Marie Victoire, four-act opera by Ottorino Respighi

Theatre 
 1904: L'Ouvrier de la dernière heure 
 1907: Anna Karénine: (after the novel by Leo Tolstoy)
 1907: Zizi
 1908: Le Poussin
 1910: Le Cœur d'Angélique 
 1911: Moïse 
 1911: Marie-Victoire
 1914 : La Sauvageonne, Théâtre des Bouffes Parisiens, 27 May   
 1922: Vautrin, (after the characters by Honoré de Balzac) 
 1923: Le Bonheur du jour 
 1925: Une femme, four-act comedy, 14 March, Théâtre Fémina 
 1930: Une femme de mon pays 
 1932: Nos 20 ans

in collaboration with Félix Galipaux 
 1905 : La Mémoire des dates

in collaboration with Léon Hennique
 1929 : Whisky

Filmography 
Actor
 1948: Tabusse by Jean Gehret 
 1948: Le Crime des justes by Jean Gehret 
 1951: Oriental Port by Jacques Daroy

Film adaptations 
 1927: Le Bonheur du jour by Gaston Ravel (piece written in 1923)
 1935: Zizi by Charles-Félix Tavano - short film -

References

External links 
 
 11 shows by Edmond Guiraud on Les archives du spectacle.net 

20th-century French dramatists and playwrights
20th-century French male actors
French opera librettists
1879 births
People from Nîmes
1961 deaths